The 1996 United States presidential election in Delaware took place on November 5, 1996, as part of the 1996 United States presidential election. Voters chose three representatives, or electors to the Electoral College, who voted for president and vice president.

Delaware was won by President Bill Clinton (D) over Senator Bob Dole (R-KS), with Clinton winning 51.82% to 36.58% by a margin of 15.24%. Billionaire businessman Ross Perot (Reform Party of the United States of America-TX) finished in third, with 10.60% of the popular vote. , this is the last election in which Sussex County voted for the Democratic candidate, and the last time a presidential candidate won every county in the state.

Results

By county

Counties that flipped from Republican to Democratic
Kent (Largest city: Dover)
Sussex (Largest city: Seaford)

See also
 United States presidential elections in Delaware

References

Delaware
1996
1996 Delaware elections